Scarva railway station serves Scarva in County Down, Northern Ireland. Despite serving the County Down village, the station itself is in County Armagh, the nearby Newry Canal being the boundary.

History
The station opened on 23 March 1859. The station was formerly the junction for the GNR(I) branch to Banbridge which opened in 1859 and closed on 2 May 1955.  Scarva station was closed between 1965 and 1984.

Service 

There is no Sunday service.

References 

Railway stations in County Armagh
Railway stations opened in 1859
Railway stations closed in 1965
Railway stations opened in 1984
Reopened railway stations in Northern Ireland
Railway stations opened by NI Railways
Railway stations served by NI Railways
Railway stations in Northern Ireland opened in the 20th century
Railway stations in Northern Ireland opened in the 19th century